Walter Serner (15 January 1889 – August 1942) was a German-language writer and essayist. His manifesto Letzte Lockerung was an important text of Dadaism.

Life
Walter Serner was born Walter Eduard Seligmann in Carlsbad (Karlovy Vary), Bohemia (then Austria-Hungary, now Czech Republic). In 1913 he studied law in the Austro-Hungarian capital of Vienna and completed his doctorate in the University of Greifswald.

With the outbreak of World War I, he escaped to Switzerland in 1914 and participated in Dada activities in Zürich, Geneva, and Paris until 1920. During World War I he was the editor of the magazines Sirius and Zeltweg and a writer for Die Aktion. In 1921 Serner stayed in Italy with the artist Christian Schad. Beginning in 1923 he began living in various European cities, including Barcelona, Bern, Vienna, Carlsbad, and Prague.

From 1925, Serner became the target of anti-Semitism. Serner had been born Jewish and had converted to Catholicism in 1913.

His play Posada premiered in Berlin in 1927, but his other planned shows were forbidden. In 1933 Serner's books were banned by the government of Nazi Germany.

In 1938 Serner married his partner Dorothea Herz in Prague, where he was working as a private teacher. When war broke out, they had no chance to escape from the occupied country. In 1942 he and his wife were interned in the Theresienstadt concentration camp and three weeks later were moved in the direction of "the East", where they perished in Riga.

Walter Serner's most successful novel Die Tigerin (The Tigress) was made into an English-language feature film by writer/director Karin Howard and released in 1992. At that time the novel was re-published in Germany where Serner's books enjoy a cult following. The film was shot in Berlin and Carlsbad.

Work

Lifetime publications
 Letzte Lockerung. manifest dada. Hannover / Leipzig / Wien / Zürich: Steegemann, 1920 
 Zum blauen Affen. Dreiunddreißig hanebüchene Geschichten. Hannover: Steegemann, 1921
 Der elfte Finger. Fünfundzwanzig Kriminalgeschichten. Hannover: Steegemann, 1923
 Der Pfiff um die Ecke. Zweiundzwanzig Spitzel- und Detektivgeschichten. Berlin: Elena Gottschalk, 1925
 Die Tigerin. Eine absonderliche Liebesgeschichte. Berlin: Gottschalk, 1925
 Die tückische Straße. Neunzehn Kriminal-Geschichten. Wien: Dezember, 1926
 Posada oder Der Große Coup im Hotel Ritz. Ein Gauner-Stück in drei Akten. Wien: Dezember, 1926

Latest publications
 Angst. Frühe Prosa. Erlangen: Renner, 1977
 Hirngeschwür. Texte und Materialien. Walter Serner und Dada. Erlangen: Renner, 1977
 Wong fun. Kriminalgeschichte. Augsburg: Maro, 1991

Collected editions
 Das gesamte Werk. Band 1-8, 3 Supplementbände. Hrsg.: Thomas Milch. Erlangen, München: Renner, 1979—1992
 Bd. 1: Über Denkmäler, Weiber und Laternen. Frühe Schriften (1981)
 Bd. 2: Das Hirngeschwür. DADA (1982)
 Bd. 3: Die Tigerin. Eine absonderliche Liebesgeschichte (1980)
 Bd. 4: Der isabelle Hengst. Sämtliche Kriminalgeschichten I (1979)
 Bd. 5: Der Pfiff um die Ecke. Sämtliche Kriminalgeschichten II (1979)
 Bd. 6: Posada oder der große Coup im Hotel Ritz. Ein Gaunerstück in drei Akten (1980)
 Bd. 7: Letzte Lockerung. Ein Handbrevier für Hochstapler und solche die es werden wollen (1981)
 Bd. 8: Der Abreiser. Materialien zu Leben und Werk (1984)
 Bd. 9 = Supplementbd. 1: Die Haftung des Schenkers wegen Mängel im Rechte und wegen Mängel der verschenkten Sache (1982)
 Bd. 10 = Supplementbd. 2: Das fette Fluchen. Ein Walter Serner-Gaunerwörterbuch (1983)
 Bd. 11 = Supplementbd. 3: Krachmandel auf Halbmast. Nachträge zu Leben und Werk (1992) (sehr versch. Texte, Dokumente und Abb. von und über W. S., Dada, Christian Schad u. a., mit Erl.)
 Gesammelte Werke in zehn Bänden. Hrsg. von Thomas Milch. München: Goldmann, 1988
 Bd. 1: Über Denkmäler, Weiber und Laternen. Frühe Schriften (enthält den Supplementband 1 der Renner-Ausgabe)
 Bd. 2: Das Hirngeschwür. DADA
 Bd. 3: Zum blauen Affen. Dreiunddreißig Kriminalgeschichten
 Bd. 4: Der elfte Finger. Fünfundzwanzig Kriminalgeschichten
 Bd. 5: Die Tigerin. Eine absonderliche Liebesgeschichte
 Bd. 6: Der Pfiff um die Ecke. Zweiundzwanzig Kriminalgeschichten
 Bd. 7: Posada oder der große Coup im Hotel Ritz. Ein Gaunerstück in drei Akten
 Bd. 8: Die tückische Straße. Neunzehn Kriminalgeschichten
 Bd. 9: Letzte Lockerung. Ein Handbrevier für Hochstapler und solche die es werden wollen
 Bd. 10: Der Abreiser. Materialien zu Leben und Werk (enthält den Supplementband 2 der Renner-Ausgabe)
 Sprich deutlich. Sämtliche Gedichte und Dichtungen. Hrsg.: Klaus G. Renner. München: Renner, 1988
 Das Walter-Serner-Lesebuch. Alle 99 Kriminalgeschichten in einem Band. München: Goldmann, 1992
 Das erzählerische Werk in drei Bänden. Hrsg.: Thomas Milch. München: Goldmann/btb, 2000, 
 Bd. 1: Zum blauen Affen / Der elfte Finger
 Bd. 2: Die Tigerin
 Bd. 3: Der Pfiff um die Ecke / Die tückische Straße

References

External links

The Necessity to Disappear (about  Walter Serner) by Peter Luining
Twisted Spoon Press's Serner page

1889 births
1942 deaths
Writers from Karlovy Vary
Converts to Roman Catholicism from Judaism
Czech Roman Catholics
Czech Jews
Dada
Czech male writers
Jewish refugees
University of Greifswald alumni
Theresienstadt Ghetto prisoners
20th-century German male writers
Czech Jews who died in the Holocaust